Matriarchs may refer to:
 Matriarchy
 Matriarcas (English: Matriarchs), s Chilean soap opera
 Patriarchs (Bible)#Matriarchs